Juan Tizón Herreros (23 January 1895, in La Coruña – 25 December 1945, in Oporto) was a Spanish politician and writer who was exiled during the Spanish Civil War.

Political career
He was a railway worker and was active in the Spanish Socialist Workers' Party (PSOE) and in the Unión General de Trabajadores (UGT) trade union. He led the local socialist group in La Coruña. Later he moved to Monforte de Lemos, and was appointed as branch secretary in the railway workers' section of the UGT.

In the general elections of 1931 he was elected as a PSOE deputy for Lugo Province to the national parliament. However, due to irregularities, the elections in that province were repeated and he lost his position. He also became an alternate member of the Federal Committee of the PSOE.

He became vice-president of the Lugo provincial government, and president of the first Republican management committee of Monforte de Lemos. During the uprising of 1934 he was arrested and spent some time in prison. He was mayor of Monforte de Lemos from 18 March to 20 July 1936.

Exile
Upon the military rising of July 1936 he attempted to organise local resistance, by forming a militia and seizing weapons. After the declaration of war the town was occupied by the Civil Guard, compelling him to escape. He took refuge in Oporto in Portugal at the home of Portuguese friends of his, among whom was Mário Soares. He died in that city in 1945 and is buried there. While in Portugal he worked for the British secret service.

All through the Franco period he was assumed in Monforte to have been killed by some Falangist death squad. This belief was supported by gunfire damage to a commemorative plaque on a fountain that he had installed.

Writings
In 1925 he published a book of short stories in Spanish, Espiando al diablo (En: Spying on the devil). In 1937-38 he wrote a satirical poem in Galician, Seis cregos escollidos (Versos divinos) (En: Six chosen priests (divine verses)), published posthumously in 2001 by Xesús Alonso Montero.

In 2010 the Luis Tilve Foundation recompiled and published all of his hitherto unpublished work under the title of Juan Tizón Herreros. El pensamiento hecho palabra (En: Thought made into words). This work brings together: two plays on social themes, Casta Maldita and Civilización (En: Accursed Breed, Civilisation); two short stories, El cristo del hallazgo and Persecución (En: Christ Discovered and Persecution) - the latter recompiled by his son-in-law Raúl Solleiro Mella - in which he writes of his flight after the military rising; various articles; and an extended biography written by the historian Rosa María López González.

References

External links 
 Mayors of Monforte
 Fundación Luis Tilve

Politicians from Galicia (Spain)
Spanish Socialist Workers' Party politicians
Spanish people of the Spanish Civil War (Republican faction)
Galician poets
Spanish male dramatists and playwrights
Mayors of places in Galicia
20th-century Spanish poets
Spanish refugees
Spanish trade unionists
1895 births
1945 deaths
Spanish male poets
Spanish male short story writers
Spanish short story writers
20th-century Spanish dramatists and playwrights
People from A Coruña
20th-century short story writers
Members of the Congress of Deputies of the Second Spanish Republic
Exiles of the Spanish Civil War in Portugal